Liebowitz is a surname. It may refer to:

People
 Jack Liebowitz (1900–2000), American accountant and publisher, co-owner of Detective Comics
 Michael Liebowitz, psychiatrist and researcher specializing in anxiety disorders
 Richard Liebowitz, copyright lawyer
 Ronald D. Liebowitz (born 1957), president of Middlebury College
 Shimen Liebowitz, American extortionist
 Sidney Liebowitz, better known as Steve Lawrence (born 1935), American singer
 Simon J. Liebowitz (1905–1998), New York politician and judge

Fictional characters
 Fawn Liebowitz, a fictional character mentioned in the movie National Lampoon's Animal House

See also 
 Leibowitz
 Leibovitz
 Lebowitz

Jewish surnames
Slavic-language surnames